Yamanni-ryū  (山根流) (also Yamanni-Chinen-ryū and Yamane Ryu) is a form of Okinawan kobudō whose main weapon is the bo, a non-tapered, cylindrical staff. The smaller buki, such as sai, tunfa (or tonfa), nunchaku, and kama (weapon) are studied as secondary weapons.

Lineage

Tradition maintains that Sakugawa Kanga, entrusted with the protection of prominent Ryūkyū families, had studied the art in China. Later he lived in Akata village in Shuri, Okinawa. Sakugawa developed the style in the late 18th century. He passed it on to the Chinen family, beginning with Chinen Umikana. Sanda Chinen (1842–1925), also known as Yamani USUMEI and Yamane TANMEI, introduced the "bouncing" motion of the staff which is the style's hallmark. His grandson, Masami Chinen, named the style after him. Masami Chinen's grandnephew Teruo Chinen was the last family member to practice the style.

Ryūkyū Bujutsu Kenkyu Doyukai / Kishaba-Ha Yamanni-Ryu

In 1979 Chogi Kishaba, a student of Masami Chinen, sent his students, Toshihiro Oshiro and Kiyoshi Nishime, to the United States. In 1985 they founded the Ryūkyū Bujutsu Kenkyu Doyukai or RBKD (Association for the Study and Research of Okinawan Martial Arts) for the purpose of bringing Yamanni-ryū to the West. Kishaba is the head of the RBKD.  Shihan Oshiro (8th dan, Yamanni-ryū; 9th dan, Shōrin-ryū) was the Chief Instructor of RBKD USA and its West Coast Director, he returned to Okinawa to live and teaches out of the Naha Budokan. The Midwest Director is Kiyoshi Nishime. Oshiro and Nishime give seminars in Yamanni-ryū in the U.S. and around the world. This branch of the style is referred too as Yamane-Kishaba-Ryu or Kishaba-ha Yamanni-Ryu. The RBKD Yamanni-ryū patch is based on an Okinawan mon. It is similar to the mon of the Takeda clan.

Kata of RBKD:
 Donyukon Ichi,
 Donyukon Ni,
 Choun No Kun Sho,
 Choun No Kun Dai, 
 Shuji no Kun Sho, 
 Shuji no Kun Dai, 
 Ryubi no kon, 
 Sakugawa No Kun
 Shirataru no Kun, 
 Tomari Shirataru no Kun,
 Yunigawa no Kun / Yonegawa no Kun / Hidari Bo, 
 Shinakachi no Kun / Sunakake no Kun, 
 Chikin Bo / Tsuken Bo

Maeda Dojo
Maeda Kiyomasa was a senior student of Kishaba Chogi and was promoted to 9th Dan in Yamane-Ryu by Kishaba. The Kanbun (Sign) for the Yamane-Ryu Hombu dojo was gifted to Maeda by Kishaba upon his passing.

Kata of Maeda Dojo: 
 Choun No Kon Ichi, 
 Choun No Kon Ni,
 Shushi No Kon, 
 Sunakake No Kon, 
 Shirotaro No Kon, 
 Tomari Shirotaro No Kon

Oshiro-ha Yamane Ryu (大城派山根流)

This branch of the style centers only on the bojutsu tradition with lineage from Oshiro Chojo (1887-1935). Oshiro Chojo was a senior student of Yamaneryu Kobudo founder Chinen Sanda. (1842-1925). One of Oshiro's senior students was Kinjo Hiroshi [1919-2013], who passed on the system to Patrick McCarthy, President of the International Ryukyu Karate Research Society

Kata of IRKRS: 
 Shuji no kon, 
 Shirotaro No Kon, 
 Yonekawa no kon, 
 Sakugawa no kon, 
 Tokumine no kon, 
 Chinen-Shikiyanaka No kon, 
 Koryu No kon

See also
 Bōjutsu

References

External links
 Shihan Oshiro's Dojo
 Directory of RBKD dojos
 The Way of Yamanni-ryu

Okinawan kobudo